Christchurch Town is a ward in Christchurch, Dorset. Since 2019, the ward has elected 2 councillors to Bournemouth, Christchurch and Poole Council. Before then the Town Centre ward elected two councillors to Christchurch Borough Council.

History 
The Town Centre ward elected Conservative Councillors at the 2015 Christchurch Borough Council election.

In the first election to 2019 Bournemouth, Christchurch and Poole Council in 2019, Christchurch Town was the only ward in Christchurch to elect a Liberal Democrat councillor.

Geography 
The ward is based around Christchurch Town Centre as well as Purewell and parts of Portfield. It consists mainly of the former Christchurch Borough ward of Town Centre, as well as parts of the former wards of Portfield (the remainder now part Commons) and Purewell and Stanpit (now part of Mudeford, Stanpit and West Highcliffe).

Councillors 
The ward is represented by two councillors:

Election results

2019

2015

References 

Politics of Christchurch, Dorset
Wards of Bournemouth, Christchurch and Poole